Red is a 1981 album by the Jamaican reggae band Black Uhuru. The line-up of the band changed many times during its 16 years and this is the second release for the lineup of Michael Rose, Sandra "Puma" Jones and Derek "Duckie" Simpson. Sly & Robbie were again in the production seat after having previously worked with the band on the 1980 album Sinsemilla.

Reception
Red was ranked at #3 among the top ten "Albums of the Year" for 1981 by NME.

Track listing

Personnel
Black Uhuru
Michael Rose - vocals
Derrick "Duckie" Simpson - harmony vocals
Puma Jones - harmony vocals
with:
Sly Dunbar - drums, syndrums
Robert "Robbie" Shakespeare - bass, piano
Ranchie McLean - rhythm guitar, lead guitar
Mikey Chung - rhythm guitar, lead guitar
Radcliff "Dougie" Bryan - lead guitar
Barry Reynolds - lead guitar on "Carbine"
Robert Lyn - piano
Keith Sterling - piano
Uziah "Sticky" Thompson - percussion
Technical
Chris Blackwell - executive producer
Soldgie (Cedrica Anthony Hamilton) - sound engineer
Lancelot "Maxie" McKenzie - vocal engineer
Kendal Stubbs - guitar overdubs engineer
Johnnie Black - photography

References

1981 albums
Albums produced by Sly and Robbie
Black Uhuru albums
Mango Records albums